Richard Neville Jackson (born 8 December 1979) is an English cricketer.  Jackson was a right-handed batsman who bowled right-arm off break.  He was born at Sittingbourne, Kent.

Jackson represented the Sussex Cricket Board in 4 List A matches.  These came against Shropshire and Gloucestershire in the 2001 Cheltenham & Gloucester Trophy and the Essex Cricket Board and Wales Minor Counties in the 1st and 2nd rounds of the 2002 Cheltenham & Gloucester Trophy which was held in 2001.  In his 4 List A matches, he scored 56 runs at a batting average of 14.00, with a high score of 22.

References

External links
Richard Jackson at Cricinfo
Richard Jackson at CricketArchive

1979 births
Living people
People from Sittingbourne
English cricketers
Sussex Cricket Board cricketers